The following are the telephone codes in Sierra Leone.

Calling formats
To call in Sierra Leone, the following format is used:
 xxxxxx          - Calls within an area code
 0yy xxxxxx      - Calls within Sierra Leone
 +232 yy xxxxxx  - Calls from outside Sierra Leone
The NSN length is eight digits.

List of area codes in Sierra Leone

Note: X = 0 – 9;   Y = 1 – 9;   N = 2 – 9

See also 
 Telecommunications in Sierra Leone

References

Sierra Leone
Telecommunications in Sierra Leone
Telephone numbers